Edmund Reek (19 March 1897 – 28 October 1971) was a producer of newsreels in the United States. Several of his films were nominated for best short film Academy Awards and some won. He arranged for a newsreel to capture images of Pearl Harbor.

A letter to him from Bill Burch survives.

Academy Awards

Won
Day won one Academy Award for Best Live Action Short Film and One for Best Documentary Short Subject:
 Best Live Action Short Film - Symphony of a City (1948)
 Best Documentary (Short Subject) - Why Korea? (1950)
 Best Love Action Short Film - Survival City (1955)

Nominated
He was nominated in the same category for a further 4 films:
 Best Love Action Short Film - Champions Carry On (1943)
 Best Love Action Short Film -Blue Grass Gentleman (1944)
 Best Love Action Short Film - Along The Rainbow Trails (1945)
 Best Love Action Short Film - Golden Horsed (1946)

Filmography
Champions Carry On (1943)
Symphony of a City (1949), about Stockholm, Sweden. Won an Oscar
Why Korea? (1950), Oscar Documentary winner
Survival City (1955), Oscar winner

References

Newsreels
1897 births
American filmmakers
1971 deaths